John Loveday may refer to:
John Loveday, the eponymous trumpet major of Thomas Hardy's 1880 novel The Trumpet-Major
John Loveday (antiquary) (1711–1789), English antiquarian
John Loveday (rugby union) (born 1949), New Zealand rugby union player
John Loveday (physicist), experimental physicist